Cycling at the 2002 Commonwealth Games was held in Rivington Park Bolton (road and mountain biking) and Manchester Velodrome (track, located in Manchester) from 27 July to 3 August.

Medal Tally

Medal summary

Mountain biking

Track

Road

References
 2002 Commonwealth Games Manchester, England, 27 July – 3 August 2002 results cyclingnews.com

2002 Commonwealth Games events
Cycling at the Commonwealth Games
2002 in cycle racing
2002 in road cycling
2002 in track cycling
Cycling competitions in the United Kingdom